The Balranald Nature Reserve is an RSPB reserve on the north west coast of North Uist, Outer Hebrides, Scotland.

The reserve is open all year round and has a small unmanned visitor centre 

Balranald has a number of birds that can be viewed there regularly such as lapwings, corn buntings, greylag geese and the famous corncrake which has a distinctive rasping sound in the summer months.  North Uist has also had some other rarer visitors such as the Snowy Owl, Black Billed Cuckoo, Gyrfalcon and the Hoopoe.

References 

Royal Society for the Protection of Birds reserves in Scotland
North Uist